Glitter Grass from the Nashwood Hollyville Strings (sometimes called Dillard - Hartford - Dillard) is an album by John Hartford, Doug Dillard, and Rodney Dillard, released in 1977.

Glitter Grass was reissued on CD in 1992 along with Permanent Wave on the Flying Fish label.

Track listing
 "Don't Come Rollin'" (Gene Clark, Doug Dillard, Bernie Leadon) – 2:13
 "Cross the Border Line" (Daniel Moore) – 2:16
 "Two Hits and the Joint Turned Brown" (John Hartford) – 3:12
 "Don't Lead Me On" (Doug Haywood) – 2:48
 "Bear Creek Hop" (Traditional) – 1:54
 "No End of Love" (Hartford) – 4:11
 "Biggest Whatever" (Rodney Dillard, Bill Martin) – 3:18
 "Lost in a World" (R. Dillard, Linda Dillard) – 3:05
 "High Dad in the Morning" (Homer Dillard) – 2:45
 "California is Nicer Than You" (D. Dillard) – 3:23
 "Artificial Limitations" (R. Dillard) – 2:27
 "Get No Better" (Hartford) – 3:27

Personnel
 Rodney Dillard – vocals, dobro, guitar
 Doug Dillard – vocals, banjo, guitar
 John Hartford – vocals, banjo, fiddle, guitar
 Sam Bush – mandolin
 Jim Colvard – guitar
 Mac Cridlin – bass
 Linda Dillard – vocals
 Buddy Emmons – dobro, pedal steel guitar, harmony vocals
 Amos Garrett – guitar
 Jeff Gilkenson – harmonica, cello
 Kenny Malone – drums, percussion
 Scott Mathews – drums
 Michael Melford – mandolin, harmony vocals
 Hargus "Pig" Robbins – piano, keyboards
 Greg Selker – marimba
 Philip Aaberg – synthesizer, piano, clavinet
 Samm Bennett – conga
 Henry Strzelecki – bass
 Laura Creamer – vocals
 Ginger Blake – vocals
 Benny Martin – harmony vocals
 Pepper Watkins – harmony vocals
Production notes:
 Michael Melford – producer
 Ernie Winfrey – engineer
 Allen Sudduth – engineer

References

External links
LP Discography of John Hartford.

1977 albums
John Hartford albums